Mirzaganj is an upazila of Patuakhali District in the Division of Barisal, Bangladesh.

History
At the initial stage of the War of Liberation in 1971 a large number of youths were given military training in the training centre at village Deuli of this upazila. In an encounter between the Pakistani army and the local freedom fighters on the outskirts of Mirzaganj, 32 freedom fighters lost their lives causing heavy casualties to the enemy.

Geography
It has 21,345 households and a total area of 175.45 km2.

Demographics
According to the 2011 Bangladesh census, Mirzaganj had a population of 118054. Males constituted 50.06% of the population, and females 49.94%. The population aged 18 or over was 56,446. Average literacy rate is 42.1%; male 48.6%, female 35.6%.

Economy
Rudimentary Farming

Main crops
Paddy, sweet potato, lentil, chilli, sesame, linseed, ground nut etc.

Extinct and nearly extinct crops
Tobacco, jute and sugarcane.

Main fruits
Mango, jackfruit, banana, futi, watermelon.

Main exports
Banana, lentil, chili, rice.

Administration
Mirzaganj thana was established in 1812 and was turned into an upazila in 1983.

Mirzaganj Upazila is divided into Mirzaganj Municipality and six union parishads: Amragachia, Deuli Subidkhali, Kakrabunia, Madhabkhali, Majidbaria, and Mirzaganj. The union parishads are subdivided into 68 mauzas and 73 villages.

Education

There are five colleges in the upazila. They include Howlader Foundation Women's College, founded in 2015, Akhtar Hossain Choudhury Memorial Degree College, founded in 2002, Kismotpur Delowar Hossain Degree College, Mojidbaria Degree Sollege, Subidkhali Degree College (1972), and Subidkhali Mahila College (2000).

Educational institutions
High school: 32
Primary school: 70 (government), 62 (non-government)
Satellite school: 4
Old institutions:
 Subidkhali R I Pilot High School (1934)
 Jhatibunia M I High School ( 1934)
 Jhatibunia Govt Primary School (1926)
 Subidkhali Government Model Primary School (1940)
 Rampur Government Primary School 
 Kathaltali Government Primary School (1924)
 Basonda Government Primary School (1934)
 Madhobkhali Govt. Primary School
 Gabua Govt. Primary School
 Bhatamara Govt. Primary School
 Dakkhin Gazipur Primary School
 Sundrakalikapur High School (1969)
 Kalagachia Government Primary School (1942)
 Sunrise Kingder Garden School
Amragachhia High School
 Mirzagonj Union Dargah Shorif High School
 Samabay Seconday School Charkhali (Founder of Muslem Ali Khan)

References

Upazilas of Patuakhali District
Mirzaganj Upazila